Paul Sutherland may refer to:

 Paul Sutherland (TV producer) (1930–2004), Canadian television producer
 Paul Sutherland (politician) (born c. 1955), Canadian politician
 Paul Sutherland, ballet dancer that staged the ballet Rodeo